Rho-related BTB domain-containing protein 1 is a protein that in humans is encoded by the RHOBTB1 gene.

The protein encoded by this gene belongs to the Rho family of the Ras superfamily of small GTPases. It contains a GTPase domain, a proline-rich region, a tandem of 2 BTB (broad complex, tramtrack, and bric-a-brac) domains, and a conserved C-terminal region. The protein plays a role in small GTPase-mediated signal transduction and the organization of the actin filament system. Alternate transcriptional splice variants have been characterized.

References

Further reading